Eurema proterpia, the tailed orange, is a North and South American butterfly in the family Pieridae.

Description
The upperside of the wings is orange with a variable amount of black along the forewing costa. The wing veins are lightly marked with black in summer individuals, and winter individuals have no black veins. Males reflect UV light on their upper sides, and some females can be white. The underside of the wings varies depending on the season. Summer individuals are yellow orange with the hindwing slightly pointed. Winter individuals are brown with darker brown markings with the hindwing being much more pointed. The wingspan measures  to  inches (32–44 mm).

Similar species
The only similar species in the tailed orange's range is the sleepy orange (Eurema nicippe).

The sleepy orange has a black forewing cell spot on the upperside, the upperside of the hindwing has a black marginal border, and the hindwing is not pointed.

Habitat
The tailed orange lives in a variety of open habitats such as open woodlands, deserts and subtropical habitats.

Flight
This species may be found from mid-July to early January in Arizona, from August to November in Texas, and all year round in Mexico.

Life cycle
Males patrol all day in search of females. The larva is bright yellow green with a yellow lateral stripe.

Host plants
Host plants of the tailed orange include:

 Cassia texana
 Chamaecrista species
 Desmodium species
 Prosopis reptans
 Senna chamaecrista

References

F. Martin Brown and Bernard Heineman, Jamaica and its Butterflies (E. W. Classey, London 1972), plate VI

proterpia
Butterflies of North America
Butterflies of Central America
Butterflies of the Caribbean
Pieridae of South America
Butterflies of Cuba
Butterflies of Jamaica
Lepidoptera of Brazil
Lepidoptera of Colombia
Lepidoptera of Ecuador
Lepidoptera of Venezuela
Fauna of the Amazon